Canadian Club is a brand of Canadian whisky  produced by Beam Suntory. Popularly known as CC, Canadian Club was created by Hiram Walker and Sons, an evolution of a brand around a product that took place over the second half of the nineteenth century.  Hiram Walker merged with Gooderham & Worts, Ltd. in 1926, yielding Hiram Walker-Gooderham & Worts, Ltd.

History
Hiram Walker founded his distillery in 1858 in Detroit. He first learned how to distill cider vinegar in his grocery store in the 1830s before moving on to whisky and producing his first barrels in 1854. However, with the Prohibition movement gathering momentum and Michigan already becoming "dry," Walker decided to move his distillery across the Detroit River to Windsor, Ontario. From here, he was able to export his whisky and start to develop Walkerville, a model community that Walker financed to provide housing and services for his employees.

Walker's whisky was particularly popular in the late 19th century gentlemen's clubs of the United States and Canada; hence it became known as "Club Whisky." Walker originally positioned the whisky as a premium liquor, pitching it not only on its smoothness and purity but also its five-year oak barrel aging.

Club Whisky became very popular and American distillers petitioned for the inclusion of the word "Canada" on the bottle to distinguish it from their competing whiskies, thinking it would hamper the popularity of Walker's. This backfired, only making Club Whisky more exclusive. Walker saw this and changed the label again in 1889 adding the word "Canadian" to the top of the label, distinguishing Walker's recipe for his whisky from the other processes of the time. In 1890, the word "Canadian" was moved down from the top of the label and incorporated into the name of the whisky.

Walker's distillery passed to his sons upon his death in 1899. At one point, the Walkers employed almost the entire population of Walkerville, where they built police and fire stations, brought in running water and installed street lights. In 1890, the Canadian government acknowledged Walkerville as a legal town. It was incorporated into Windsor in 1935.

During the years of Prohibition, one of the distillery's most important clients was Chicago gangster Al Capone, who smuggled in thousands of cases of Canadian Club via a route from Windsor to Detroit.

Canadian Club has received the royal warrants of Queen Victoria, Edward VII, George V, George VI, and Elizabeth II. Hiram Walker & Sons is the only North American distiller to have been granted a royal warrant.

The Walker distillery remains in production in Windsor. Canadian Club is now part of the Jim Beam portfolio. It is its number four–selling alcoholic product, behind Jim Beam bourbon whiskey, Sauza Tequila, and DeKuyper cordials.

During the Whisky War between Canada and Denmark, Canadian Club was the usual bottle left by the Canadians.

Advertising
In 1967, Hiram Walker & Sons launched their "Hide A Case" advertising campaign that enticed drinkers to seek out cases of Canadian Club hidden at exotic locations throughout the world, including Mount Kilimanjaro, Angel Falls, Mount St. Helens and the Swiss Alps. The Mount Kilimanjaro case was not discovered until a Dutch journalist happened upon it in the mid-1970s. A small number of cases, such as one hidden above the Arctic Circle, were never found.

The first "Hide A Case" campaign officially ended in 1971. A second was started in 1975, where cases were hidden in places intended to be easier to access, such as in Death Valley and on top of a skyscraper in New York City. This second campaign ended in 1981; between it and the first, 22 cases were hidden and at least 16 recovered.

A print ad for the drink would serve as inspiration for the pre-title sequence of the 1977 Bond movie, The Spy Who Loved Me.

In the 2007 IndyCar Series season, they were main the sponsor for Andretti Green Racing #27 driver, Dario Franchitti during their championship winning season, which also included winning the 2007 Indianapolis 500.

The "Hide A Case" campaign was revived in 2010. According to the contest website, there is a $100,000 grand prize, among other prizes, for the contest's latest incarnation.

Canadian Club was a frequent product placement in the  AMC show Mad Men, often being the drink of choice for the main character Don Draper.

Types

Current Lineup

Canadian Club whisky comes in seven versions, and as a straight rye. All are 80 proof (40% alcohol by volume) except where noted otherwise.

Canadian Club 1858
The base version, does not carry an age statement. Sold in more than 150 countries, it is most popular line of Canadian Club and is often used as a mixer. In Australia and New Zealand it is 74 proof (37% abv).

Canadian Club Reserve
Aged 9 years.

Canadian Club Classic
Aged 12 years.

Canadian Club 100% Rye
Crafted entirely from single-grain rye.

Canadian Club Apple
Canadian Club 1858 with added apple flavour.

Canadian Club Dock No. 57
Canadian Club 1858 with added blackberry flavour.

Canadian Club Mixed & Ready
Launched in Australia in April 2001, Canadian Club Mixed & Ready is a ready-to-drink (RTD) mix consisting of a 4.8% ABV pre-mixed blend of six-year-old Canadian Club with dry ginger ale, cola, or soda and lime.  It is sold in 330mL bottles and 375mL cans. All flavours are also available in New Zealand. An Australian advertising campaign to pitch Canadian Club to those who were "over beer" was hugely successful, and launched internationally.

6% ABV "Premium Strength" is available only in 375mL cans and is mixed with dry ginger ale.

Limited edition / Discontinued
Canadian Club Premium

Canadian Club Reserve
Aged 10 years.

Canadian Club Limited Edition
Aged 20 years.

Canadian Club Chronicles 41, 42, 43 and 44
Aged 41, 42, 43 or 44 years.

Canadian Club 100 Proof
Aged six years and bottled at 100 proof (50% abv).

Canadian Club Sherry Cask
Double-matured, first in white oak barrels for at least eight years; then casks from the Sherry wine region (Spain). It is 82.6-proof (41.3% abv).

Canadian Club is also produced in limited quantities in older agings (15 years and up) for special markets. For the whisky's 150th anniversary in 2008, a 30-year-old version was released in a very limited bottling.

See also
 Gooderham and Worts Distillery
 Hiram Walker
 Harry C. Hatch
 Canadian whisky
 Whisky
 Distilled beverage

References

Bibliography

External links

 Canadian Club
 Walkerville Times

Canadian whisky
Canadian brands
Economy of Windsor, Ontario
1858 establishments in Canada
British Royal Warrant holders
Canadian alcoholic drinks
Beam Suntory
Canadian drinks
Canadian cuisine